L'Écho du Cambodge (Echo of Cambodia) is a French-language weekly socialist newspaper published from Phnom Penh, Cambodia. The newspaper was founded in 1922. 

In 1929, there was a Vietnamese-language supplement to the newspaper for a brief period.

In 1937, the director of the newspaper was André Alliès.

References

French-language newspapers published in Asia
Newspapers published in Cambodia
Publications established in 1922
Mass media in Phnom Penh
Socialist newspapers